Rasi may refer to:

People
Alessio Rasi (born 1999), Italian footballer
Francesco Rasi (1574–1621), Italian composer, singer (tenor), chitarrone player, and poet
Guido Rasi (born 1954), Italian physician and former Executive Director of the European Medicines Agency
Marjatta Rasi (born 1945), Finnish diplomat
Muhammad ibn Zakariya al-Razi (or Rasis;  865–925 CE), Persian polymath, physician, alchemist, philosopher
Petteri Rasi, Finnish professional ice hockey player
Raasi (actress)
Ras-I Dowling (b. 1988), American football cornerback
Richard Raši (b. 1971), Slovak physician and politician

Work
Responsibility assignment matrix, one of many alternatives of RACI

Culture
Rāśi, Hindu zodiacal sign
Kanni Rasi (Virgo Sign), 1985 Tamil-language drama film

Places
Raşi and Sălcioara, in Romania
Rasi Salai Dam, in Thailand